Norman "Norm" Patrick Hines (December 27, 1938May 1, 2016) was an American sculptor. He is known for his Caelum Moor sculpture in Arlington, Texas, which features five large stone arrangements placed around a park. Hines taught at Pomona College, his alma mater, from 1961 to 2000.

References

External links

American sculptors
Pomona College alumni
Pomona College faculty
People from Claremont, California
2016 deaths
1938 births